Ab Gazan (also Romanized as Āb Gazān; also known as Ābgazān-e Pākūh, Āb Gazān Pākū, and Ab Gozān Pākū) is a village in Abnama Rural District, in the Central District of Rudan County, Hormozgan Province, Iran. At the 2006 census, its population was 131, in 31 families.

References 

Populated places in Rudan County